Fiona McHugh is an Irish journalist and editor. Educated at University College Dublin, where she studied English and philosophy. As a journalist, she worked for The Economist, Bloomberg, and Reuters, before being appointed editor of the Irish edition of The Sunday Times, in 2000, succeeding Rory Godson, a position she held until 2005. With her husband, property developer Paul Byrne, they founded Fallon & Byrne, the high-end food store in 2005, in Exchequer Street in Dublin. In 2017, they opened another branch in Rathmines, which included a restaurant. The Rathmines branch was closed in January 2020, and they sold Fallon & Byrne in early 2020. McHugh and her husband still own and run Lenehans Bar and Grill, in Rathmines.

References

Year of birth missing (living people)
Living people
Irish newspaper editors
Irish women editors
Irish journalists
Irish women journalists
Alumni of University College Dublin